The 1910 Wimbledon Championships took place on the outdoor grass courts at the All England Lawn Tennis and Croquet Club in Wimbledon, London, United Kingdom. The tournament ran from 20 June until 30 June. It was the 34th staging of the Wimbledon Championships, and the second Grand Slam tennis event of 1910.

The All England Club laid asphalt pathways round the courts.  There was a field of 92 competitors for the men's singles.

This was the first Wimbledon tournament during the reign of King George V.

Champions

Men's singles

 Anthony Wilding defeated  Arthur Gore  6–4, 7–5, 4–6, 6–2

Women's singles

 Dorothea Lambert Chambers defeated  Dora Boothby  6–2, 6–2

Men's doubles

 Major Ritchie /  Anthony Wilding defeated  Herbert Roper Barrett /  Arthur Gore, 6–1, 6–1, 6–2

References

External links
 Official Wimbledon Championships website

 
Wimbledon Championships
Wimbledon Championships
Wimbledon Championships